Dorcadion tenuelineatum is a species of beetle in the family Cerambycidae. It was described by Jakovlev in 1895.

See also 
Dorcadion

References

tenuelineatum
Beetles described in 1895